Mannahatta may refer to:

 the Lenape name for Manhattan
 Mannahatta (1860 poem), a poem by Walt Whitman
 Manhatta (1921 film), a short film by Charles Sheeler and Paul Strand inspired by Whitman's poem
 Mannahatta (2013 film), an animated film by Joshua Frankel set to Whitman's poem
 Manahatta (2018 play), a play by Mary Kathryn Nagle
 Mannahatta Project, a project by the Wildlife Conservation Society